Jo Shaw FRSE holds the Salvesen Chair of European Institutions, one of the established chairs at the University of Edinburgh, and was director of the Institute for Advanced Studies in the Humanities 2014-17. Between 2009 and 2014 she was dean of research of the College of Humanities and Social Science of the University of Edinburgh. Her research focuses on citizenship in the broader European context. She is the author of a widely used textbook on European Union law.

After receiving a European Research Council Advanced Investigator Award to study citizenship in the former Yugoslavia (CITSEE), she was nominated for inclusion on the web site AcademiaNet, which profiles world-leading women academics.

Before moving to Edinburgh she was professor of European law at the University of Manchester.

Professor Shaw is a fellow of the Academy of Social Sciences, Royal Society of Arts and the Royal Society of Edinburgh. In 2015 the Chancellor of the University of Edinburgh, the Princess Royal, conferred the Chancellor's Award for Research on Professor Shaw in recognition of her outstanding contributions to research. Since 2001 she has been a senior research fellow at The Federal Trust. She is co-director of the GlobalCIT Observatory at the European University Institute. She was chair of the University Association for Contemporary European Studies (UACES) between 2003 and 2006.

Selected bibliography

Books

References

External links 
 Profile page: Jo Shaw, University of Edinburgh

Year of birth missing (living people)
Living people
British women academics
Alumni of Trinity College, Cambridge
Academics of the University of Edinburgh
Women legal scholars
Fellows of the Royal Society of Edinburgh
People educated at Bradford Girls' Grammar School
Women academics
UACES award